Nankudi Vellalar/Nangudi Vellalar or Sivakalai Pillaimar (Pillai) is a Tamil sub caste of Vellalar found in Tamil Nadu, India. They claim descent from the Velir clan of Irungovels The hereditary headman of the caste was always invested with the title Irungovel. Their original stronghold seems to have been southern districts of Tamil Nadu, viz. Thoothukudi, Tirunelveli, Korkai, Ambasamudram, etc. Some of them migrated to Srivaikuntam during the course of time and came to be known as Kottai Vellalar or Kottai Pillaimar as they built and lived in forts.

H.R Pate (1917), the former district collector of Tirunelveli describes them as agriculturists, merchants and traders and as a remarkably prosperous and an energetic community.

Etymology
Nankudi Vellalar is derived from the words Nar(good), Kudi (community) and Vellalar (farmers), so they were essentially a good community of farmers.

Caste structure
The caste is made of a number of matrilineal exogamous clans called Kilais or branches descending from the female line.

References
Citations

Bibliography

Vellalar
Social groups of Tamil Nadu
Indian castes
● The history of Nankudi Vellalar was described in a tamil book named நற்குடி வேளாளர் வரலாறு (நூல்)